James Browning is the name of:

 James Browning (Texas politician) (1850–1921), Texas politician and lawyer
 James R. Browning (1918–2012), U.S. Court of Appeals judge
 James L. Browning Jr. (1932–2016), California jurist
 James O. Browning (born 1956), U.S. District Court judge
 Jim Browning (trade unionist) (died 1983), British trade union leader
 Jim Browning (YouTuber), British YouTuber and scam baiter